Waiparous  is a summer village in Alberta, Canada. It is located along Highway 40, at the crossing of Waiparous Creek, west of Cochrane.

Demographics 

In the 2016 Census of Population conducted by Statistics Canada, the Summer Village of Waiparous had a population of 49 living in 23 of its 48 total private dwellings, a  change from its 2011 population of 42.

See also 
List of communities in Alberta
List of summer villages in Alberta
List of resort villages in Saskatchewan

References

External links 

1986 establishments in Alberta
Summer villages in Alberta
Municipal District of Bighorn No. 8